The Association coopérative de productions audio-visuelles (ACPAV) is a Canadian film cooperative, which serves as a production company for films by emerging film directors from Quebec. Established in 1971 in Montreal, the organization has played a central role in the development of the Cinema of Quebec, by producing and releasing early-career films by many of the province's most prominent and successful filmmakers. Key producers associated with the cooperative have included Marc Daigle, Bernadette Payeur and René Gueissaz.

Québec Cinéma named the organization as the winner of its Prix Iris Tribute Award at the 22nd Quebec Cinema Awards in 2021, to honour its 50th anniversary. This marked the first time in the history of that category that it was presented to an organization rather than an individual.

Selected filmography

References

External links

Film production companies of Canada
Media cooperatives in Canada
1971 establishments in Quebec
Arts organizations established in 1971
Organizations based in Montreal
Filmmaker cooperatives